Parkrose/Sumner Transit Center is a TriMet transit center and light rail station on the MAX Red Line in Portland, Oregon. It is the fourth stop north on the Airport MAX branch, and consists of an island platform in the median of Interstate 205. The entrance and exit to the transit center are on Sandy Blvd. near 95th Avenue, in the Parkrose neighborhood and east of the Sumner neighborhood.

It is a hub for bus service to Gresham, Tigard, Lents, Fairview, Vancouver, Wood Village and Clackamas. A bridge across the northbound lanes of I-205 connects the MAX platform to a park-and-ride lot and bus stops.

Park and ride
For almost 20 years before it became a transit center and MAX station, the site was already in use as a TriMet park-and-ride lot.  TriMet's proposal to build the facility, with 288 spaces on a  lot, was approved by the Multnomah County Planning Commission in September 1983, and the lot opened for use in summer 1984. It was not designated as a transit center, because it was served by only a single bus route (14-Sandy, renumbered 12 in 1986), and was referred to by TriMet as the Parkrose Park & Ride.  A second bus route, 201-Airport Way, began serving the Parkrose Park and Ride later.  In 2000–2001, a MAX light rail station was constructed adjacent to the park-and-ride lot. Additional bus routes began serving the site when the MAX station opened in September 2001, at which time it was newly designated as a transit center and was renamed Parkrose/Sumner Transit Center.

As a result of 2001 expansion of the bus roadway and stops, and the addition of a building for use by drivers on layover, the size of the park-and-ride lot was reduced and the lot currently has 193 spaces.

Bus service

This transit center is served by the following bus lines:
12 – Barbur/Sandy Blvd
21 – Sandy Blvd/223rd
71 – 60th Ave
73 – 122nd Ave
C-Tran 65 – Parkrose Regional

Unique station features 
Flashbird Bridge: Designed by Ed Carpenter and KPFF Engineering, the bridge was meant to be inspired by its location near the Columbia River and the Portland International Airport.  The form is meant to suggest a creature that might swim or fly.
Furniture: Designed by Peter Reiquam, two pieces symbolizing home and office for the direction one is going, adorn the platform.
Windscreen: Christine Bourdette and Vicki Scuri worked with the project architects to design the windscreen in ceramic frit.

See also
List of TriMet transit centers

References

External links

Parkrose/Sumner Transit Center

MAX Light Rail stations
MAX Red Line
TriMet transit centers
Railway stations in the United States opened in 2001
2001 establishments in Oregon
Parkrose, Portland, Oregon
Railway stations in Portland, Oregon
Bus stations in Portland, Oregon